RealityMine is a technology company headquartered in Manchester, England, United Kingdom which provides passive research into consumer behavior. The company was founded in April 2012 by mobile veteran Garry Partington and market research expert Rolfe Swinton, to understand the huge gap in understanding consumer behaviour: what are people actually doing on their mobile phones?

Today, RealityMine enables many of the world's largest market research and media organisations to monitor real consumers on multiple devices, across all major platforms, revealing unique insights from real life consumer behaviour. The firm's "RealityMeter" can be deployed across Android, iOS and desktop platforms. RealityMine has offices in New York, London, Manchester, and Sydney.

History 
The company was founded in April 2012 by Garry Partington and Rolfe Swinton. In December 2013, RealityMine acquired the assets of the Media Behaviour Insights, including the TouchPoints USA brand.

From 2012, the business has grew from 5 employees to 75 in 2015. In 2015 RealityMine joined the London Stock Exchange's Elite programme for high growth businesses. In January 2015 the business announced $2.5m investment to support its rapid growth strategy.

In 2018, former Research Now co-founder, Chris Havemann, was named CEO.

Honors and awards
RealityMine has won awards including "2015 Top 100 Startups", "2015 Mobile Research Agency of the Year" by MRMW, "2015 Top 100 Europe" by Red Herring, "2015 Northern Tech Rising Star" by GP Bullhound, "2016 Queens Award for International Export", and was a "Best Innovation Finalist" in the 2016 MRS Awards by the Market Research Society.

References

External links
AdWeek Infographic: How Mobile Use Varies Across Generations
Media Post: Social Networking Preferred On Mobile, Tablets Favoured For TV

Market research companies of the United Kingdom